Sun Cong (born February 14, 1961) is a Chinese aviation engineer, deputy designer with Aviation Industry Corporation of China and Chief Designer of the Shenyang FC-31 Shenyang J-15 fighters.

References 

1961 births
Chinese engineers
Chinese inventors
Chinese aerospace engineers
20th-century Chinese engineers
Living people